Willem Paul "Wim" van Duyl (24 May 1920 – 3 September 2006) was a sailor from the Netherlands. He competed in the Dragon class at the 1948, 1952, 1960 and 1964 Olympics and finished in 8th, 6th, 13th and 13th place, respectively. He missed the 1956 Games due to their boycott by the Netherlands.

Van Duyl was CEO of Bull Nederland and later Honeywell Bull Netherlands.

Controversy
During the Olympic regatta of 1964 a controversy emerged between the team members (Van Duyl and Jongkind) of the Dutch Dragon resulting in Jongkind leaving Japan after the second race. After the Games the Koninklijk Nederlands Watersport Verbond banned them both from competitions for two years.

Sources

External links
 
 
 

1920 births
2006 deaths
Sportspeople from Amsterdam
Dutch male sailors (sport)
Olympic sailors of the Netherlands
Sailors at the 1948 Summer Olympics – Dragon
Sailors at the 1952 Summer Olympics – Dragon
Sailors at the 1960 Summer Olympics – Dragon
Sailors at the 1964 Summer Olympics – Dragon